Yama-chan is a nickname that may refer to:

 Kōichi Yamadera (born 1961), Japanese actor
 Ryota Yamasato (born 1977), Japanese comedian